This list of fictional cats and other felines is subsidiary to the list of fictional cats. It is restricted solely to notable feline characters from notable live action, (or primarily live action) films. For characters that appear in several separate films, only the earliest film will be recorded here.

See also
 List of fictional felines
 List of fictional big cats

References

 
 
Film
Fictional cats in film
Cats